Edward Hopkinson (28 May 1859 – 15 January 1922) was a British electrical engineer and Conservative politician.

He was the fourth son of John Hopkinson, an engineer who was mayor of Manchester in 1882/83. Hopkinson was educated at Owen's College, Manchester and Emmanuel College, Cambridge. He graduated from Emmanuel in 1881 and was made a fellow of the college in 1883. In 1882 he began to study mechanical and electrical engineering under Sir William Siemens, and received a doctorate from the University of London.

Hopkinson was involved in a number of large pioneering electrification projects. These included the Bessbrook and Newry Tramway, the Snaefell Mountain Railway the Blackpool and Fleetwood tramways and the City and South London Railway. For a paper on his pioneering work on the Bessbrook and Newry tramway he was awarded the Telford Medal in 1888 by the Institution of Civil Engineers and for a paper on his work on the C&SLR the George Stephenson Medal in 1893 by the same society.

In 1884 he joined Mather and Platt engineering company of Salford as head of the electrical engineering department, and rose to become vice-chairman of the company.

From 1916 to 1918 he was a member of the Indian Industrial Commission.

In 1918 he was chosen as the Coalition Conservative candidate for the newly formed Clayton constituency of Manchester. He was elected, defeating the Labour MP, J E Sutton.

He married Minnie Campbell of County Antrim, and they had two children. His elder brothers included the noted physicist and engineer John Hopkinson, and Sir Alfred Hopkinson, vice-chancellor of the University of Manchester, and amongst his nephews were engineer and scientist Bertram Hopkinson, and Austin Hopkinson, MP. Edward Hopkinson died at his residence in Alderley Edge, Cheshire in 1922, aged 62.

References

Further reading
Hopkinson, Mary & Ewing, Irene, Lady (eds.) (1948) John and Alice Hopkinson 1824–1910. London: Farmer & Sons, printers

External links 
 

1859 births
1922 deaths
Conservative Party (UK) MPs for English constituencies
UK MPs 1918–1922
Alumni of Emmanuel College, Cambridge
Fellows of Emmanuel College, Cambridge
British electrical engineers
Edward